
Year 586 (DLXXXVI) was a common year starting on Tuesday (link will display the full calendar) of the Julian calendar. The denomination 586 for this year has been used since the early medieval period, when the Anno Domini calendar era became the prevalent method in Europe for naming years.

Events 
 By place 

 Byzantine Empire 
 Spring – Emperor Maurice rejects a peace proposal of the Persians, in exchange for renewed payments in gold.
 Battle of Solachon: A Byzantine army under command of Philippicus defeats the Sassanid Persians, near Dara.
 The Avars besiege Thessalonica (Central Macedonia), the second city of the Byzantine Empire.
 The Vlachs are first mentioned in a Byzantine chronicle (approximate date).

 Europe 
 April 21 – King Liuvigild dies at Toledo after an 18-year reign, and is succeeded by his second son Reccared I.
 Slavs advance to the gates of Thessaloniki and the Peloponnese.
 Avars destroy a lien of Roman camps along the Danubian Limes, including Oescus and Ratiaria.

 By topic 

 Art 
 The Page with the Crucifixion, from the "Rabbula Gospels", at the Monastery of St. John in Beth Zagba (Syria), is completed. It is now kept at the Biblioteca Medicea Laurenziana, Florence, Italy.

 Religion 
 Japanese Buddhism comes under attack as a "foreign" religion.
 Saint Comgall founds an abbey in Bangor, Northern Ireland.
 King Custennin of Dumnonia is converted to Christianity.

Births 
 Theudebert II, king of Austrasia (d. 612)
 Yang Hao, prince of the Sui Dynasty (approximate date)

Deaths 
 April 21 – Liuvigild, king of the Visigoths
 Hermenegild, Visigothic prince (or 585)
 Prætextatus, bishop of Rouen (or 589) 
 Rhun Hir ap Maelgwn, king of Gwynedd
 Zhu Manyue, empress of Northern Zhou (b. 547)

References

Bibliography